This is a list of awards and nominations received by Monsta X, a South Korean boy group formed through the reality survival program No.Mercy under Starship Entertainment on May 14, 2015.

Awards and nominations

Other accolades

State and cultural honors

Listicles

See also
 Awards and nominations received by Shownu
 Awards and nominations received by Minhyuk
 Awards and nominations received by Kihyun
 Awards and nominations received by Hyungwon
 Awards and nominations received by I.M

Notes

References

Monsta X
Awards